Gilbane's Service Center Building is an historic automotive service station at 175-191 Pawtucket Avenue in Pawtucket, Rhode Island.  It is an L-shaped structure, built of concrete blocks and finished in stucco.  Its most prominent feature is a whimsical Art Deco tower, built up from one of the corners nearest the street in five stepped tiers.  Details from the tower are repeated in the decoration of the roofline above the building's service bays.  This building was built c. 1931, and is a second-phase automotive service station, one which offered repair services as well as fuel, and is one of the finest surviving examples of the form in the state.

The building was listed on the National Register of Historic Places in 1983.

See also
National Register of Historic Places listings in Pawtucket, Rhode Island

References

Art Deco architecture in Rhode Island
Commercial buildings on the National Register of Historic Places in Rhode Island
Buildings and structures in Pawtucket, Rhode Island
National Register of Historic Places in Pawtucket, Rhode Island